Fuller House is an American family sitcom and sequel to the 1987–95 television series Full House, airing as a Netflix original series. It was created by Jeff Franklin, and is produced by Jeff Franklin Productions and Miller-Boyett Productions in association with Warner Horizon Television. The series follows D.J. Tanner-Fuller, a veterinarian and widowed mother of three sons, whose sister and best friend—the mother to a teenage daughter—provide support in her sons' upbringings by moving in with her. Most of the original series ensemble cast have reprised their roles on Fuller House, either as regular cast members or in guest appearances, with the exception of Mary-Kate and Ashley Olsen, who alternated in the role of Michelle Tanner on Full House.

 On January 31, 2019, the show was renewed for a fifth and final season of eighteen episodes. The first nine episodes premiered on December 6, 2019, with the final nine released on June 2, 2020.

Series overview

Episodes

Season 1 (2016)

Season 2 (2016)

Season 3 (2017)

Season 4 (2018)

Season 5 (2019–20)

References

Episodes, Fuller House
Split television seasons
Lists of American sitcom episodes
2010s television-related lists